The Ecuador national rugby union team represents Ecuador in international rugby union play. Ecuador recently became a member of the Confederación Sudamericana de Rugby in 2011. They are not affiliated with World Rugby, and will not play qualifiers for the Rugby World Cup until it is. The Ecuadorian Rugby Federation governs the sport of rugby in the country.

Ecuador played their first international tournament in December 2012, playing in the 2012 CONSUR C Championship, finishing third out of four teams.

Players
Rugby in Ecuador is very much a minor sport so there are very few players who play professionally. The only current professional rugby player from Ecuador is Miguel Ángel Coronel Densy who plays for the current Spanish champions La Vila in the División de Honor and the Amlin Challenge Cup.

Record

Overall

References

External links

South American national rugby union teams
Rugby union in Ecuador
R